Metius guillermoi is a species of ground beetle in the subfamily Pterostichinae. It was described by Will in 2005.

References

Metius (genus)
Beetles described in 2005